Amoah is a surname. Notable people with the surname include:

Cecilia Gyan Amoah (born 1947), Ghanaian diplomat and politician
Charles Amoah (born 1975), Ghanaian footballer
 Joseph Amoah (footballer, born 1981), Ghana-born Liberian football player
 Joseph Amoah (footballer, born 1994), Ghanaian football player
Matthew Amoah (born 1980), Ghanaian footballer
Patrick Amoah (born 1986), Swedish footballer

See also
Yaw Fosu-Amoah (born 1981), South African long jumper
Kofi Amoah Prah (born 1974), German long jumper

Surnames of Akan origin